Bridgeview/Greenlawn is a neighborhood in the western part of Baltimore, Maryland. Its boundaries are the north side of West Lafayette Street, the east side of Braddish Avenue, the west side of North Monroe Street, and the south side of Presstman Street. The neighborhood lies in the vicinity of Walbrook Junction, Coppin State University, Sandtown-Winchester, and Edmondson Village. Though the area was once considered middle-class, it has in the last century experienced economic depression, housing abandonment, crime and gang problems. It is populated largely by lower income African American residents and is a neighborhood where Bloods gang members are concentrated.

External links 
Bridgeview/Greenlawn, Live Baltimore

References 

African-American history in Baltimore
Neighborhoods in Baltimore
Poverty in Maryland
West Baltimore
Working-class culture in Baltimore